The 2015 Football Championship of Sumy Oblast was won by Ahrobiznes-TSK Romny.

League table

Notes:
 In table number of losses is more by two as in the game between Kobra Sumy and Kobra-SNAU Sumy both teams received losses twice.

References

External links

Football
Sumy
Sumy